Strakhovaniye Rabochikh (Workers' Insurance) was a Menshevik journal published in St. Petersburg, Russia, from December 1912 to June 1918.

References

1912 establishments in the Russian Empire
1918 disestablishments in Russia
Defunct magazines published in Russia
Defunct political magazines
Magazines established in 1912
Magazines disestablished in 1918
Magazines published in Saint Petersburg
Russian-language magazines
Political magazines published in Russia
Socialist magazines